Sebastian Siller (born 18 May 1989) is an Austrian footballer who plays for SC Kundl in the Tiroler Liga.

External links
 

Austrian footballers
Austrian Football Bundesliga players
2. Liga (Austria) players
1989 births
Living people
FC Wacker Innsbruck (2002) players
WSG Tirol players
SV Grödig players
Association football defenders
Sportspeople from Innsbruck
Footballers from Tyrol (state)